Plateau State is the twelfth-largest Nigerian state. It’s located near the centre of Nigeria and includes a range of hills surrounding the Jos Plateau, its capital, and the entire plateau itself.

Plateau State is described as "The Home of Peace and Tourism". With natural formations of rocks, hills and waterfalls, it derives its name from the Jos Plateau and has a population of around 3.5 million people.

Geography

Adjacent states
 Bauchi State – to the north east 
 Kaduna State – to the north west 
 Nasarawa State – to the south west
 Taraba State – to the south east

Boundaries
Plateau State is located in the North Central Zone out of the six geopolitical zones of Nigeria. With an area of 26,899 square kilometres, the state has an estimated population of about three million people. It is located between latitude 8°24' N and 10°30' N and longitude 8°32' E and 10°38' E. The state is named after the Jos Plateau, a mountainous area in the north of the state with rock formations. Bare rocks are scattered across the grasslands, which cover the plateau. Years of tin and columbite mining have left the area strewn with deep gorges and lakes.

Climate

Although situated in the tropical zone, the higher altitude gives the state a near-temperate climate, with an average temperature between 13 and 22 °C. Harmattan winds cause the coldest weather between December and February, with the warmest temperatures usually in the dry season months of March and April. The cooler climate has led to a reduced incidence of some tropical diseases such as malaria. The Jos Plateau is it the source of many rivers in northern Nigeria, including the Kaduna, Gongola, Hadeja and Damaturu rivers.

Geology
The Jos Plateau is thought to be an area of younger granite which was intruded through an area of older granite rock, making up the surrounding states. These "younger" granites are thought to be about 160 million years old. This creates the unusual scenery of the Jos Plateau. There are numerous hillocks with gentle slopes emerging from the ground like mushrooms scattered with huge boulders. Also, volcanic activity 50 million years ago created numerous volcanoes and vast basaltic plateaus formed from lava flows. This also produces regions of mainly narrow and deep valleys and pediments (surfaces made smooth by erosion) from the middle of rounded hills with sheer rock faces.
The phases of volcanic activities involved in the formation of Plateau State have made it one of the mineral rich states in the country.

Tin is still mined and processed on the plateau.

Tourism
Plateau State is known as The Home of Peace and Tourism in Nigeria. Although the tourism sector is not thriving due to meagre allocations by the state government, its natural endowments are still attractions to tourists, mostly from within Nigeria.

 The National Museum in Jos was founded in 1952. It is known for its archaeology and pottery collections, and with some fine Nok terracotta heads and artefacts dating from 500 BC to 200 AD.
 The Museum of Traditional Nigerian Architecture is adjacent, with life-size replicas various of buildings, from the walls of Kano to a Tiv village. Items from colonial times relating to the railway and tin mining are on display.
 Solomon Lar Amusement Park in Jos city is named after Chief Solomon Lar, a former governor of Plateau State.
 Jos Zoo was established in 1957 and has a good stock of animals, birds and reptiles.
 Assop Falls is perhaps, the most notable of Nigeria's many waterfalls. It is used as a filming location for soap operas and advertisements.
 Kurra Falls is a tourist area some 77 km southeast of Jos, and is the location of the state's first hydroelectric power station.
 Wase Rock is a dome-shaped inselberg which juts out of the ground to a height of 450 meters. It is located about 216 km southeast of Jos, near Wase town. It is one of only five breeding sites of the white pelican in Africa. Because of this, the government now protects about  around the rock as a bird sanctuary and for wildlife development.
 The Kerang highlands are located about 88 km from Jos. These volcanic hills are the source of natural mountain springs, which are use for bottled spring water. 
 The Shere Hills include some of the plateau's highest peaks. They are a range of hills to the east of Jos which have views of the city below, and attract mountain climbers and hill walkers.
 Riyom Rock is a rock formation 25 km southwest of Jos, near Riyom town.
 Pandam Game Reserve is a largely-unspoiled wildlife sanctuary with hippopotami, crocodiles, and several snake species. Park rangers track game on foot and guide the visitors.
 Kahwang Rock Formation of basalt rocks, is located in Bangai village in the Bachi district of Riyom.

Natural resources

Natural resources in the state include:
barite, bauxite, bentonite, bismuth, cassiterite, clay, coal, emeralds, fluoride, granite, iron ore, kaolin, lead / zinc, marble, molybdenite, pyrochlore, salt, tantalite / columbite, and tin / wolfram.

History

Plateau state has been adjusted to its present borders many times. Colonial manipulation was from a desire to protect the railway construction and guarantee safe passage of mined tin to the coast. There was also an attempt initially to create a province of largely non-Muslims under one Resident. Later alterations came from strong local desires for self-government.

The British began to exert colonial control of Nigeria in the early 20th century. At that time, much of Plateau State was part of Bauchi Province. In 1926, Plateau Province, made up of Jos and Pankshin Divisions, was carved out of Bauchi. The border changed several times in subsequent years as the government sought not to split ethnic groups. In May 1967, Benue and Plateau Provinces were merged to form the large Benue-Plateau State. At this time Nigeria had twelve states.

Following the civil war, Benue-Plateau State was one of several large states which were further split up following pressure on the federal government. Under the military administration of General Yakubu Gowon, the country was further divided into nineteen states in 1976 and Plateau State was created from Benue-Plateau covering the area of the original Plateau Province. In 1996, Plateau State was further subdivided to create Nasarawa State which was carved out of the western half of Plateau State by Sani Abacha's military regime.

Tin mining activities began in 1902 under the British and continue to the present day.

Government
The Plateau State administrative structure consists of the state cabinet, the House of Assembly and local government areas.

The state government is run by the governor (chief executive), deputy governor, secretary to the state government, commissioners (cabinet members), special advisers, permanent secretaries, board chairmen and general managers. The current governor is Simon Bako Lalong. He was sworn in on 29 May 2015 under the party APC.

The House of Assembly consists of 25 members and 11 special advisers. The current Speaker of the house is Rt. Hon. Yakubu Yakson Sanda who was elected on 20 October 2021 by the Honourable Members of the house following the impeachment of Rt. Hon. Ayuba Abok by the members of the 9th assembly.

The local government is headed by a chairman, who is the chief executive, while his cabinet consists of elected councilors who make up the legislative arm.

Plateau State is also divided into 17 local government areas, each encompassing ethnic groups who share common affinities or distant bloodlines. Leaders of these local government areas are elected by the people from amongst several contestants who may not be related to any past chiefdom leaders. , all the seventeen areas have elected chairmen as Management Committee Chairmen which were appointed by the governor Simon Bako Lalong for some four local government areas which include Barkin Ladi, Jos North, Jos South, and Riyom have all been replaced.

Local government areas

In 1976, Plateau State consisted of fourteen local government areas (LGAs). New LGAs were carved out of the large ones in 1989, 1991 and 1996, so that the new Plateau State is subdivided into the following seventeen LGAs:

 Barkin Ladi
 Bassa
 Bokkos
 Jos East
 Jos North
 Jos South
 Kanam
 Kanke
 Langtang North
 Langtang South
 Mangu
 Mikang
 Pankshin
 Qua'an Pan
 Riyom
 Shendam
 Wase

Demographics

The state has over forty ethno-linguistic groups. Some of the indigenous ethnic groups in the state are the Berom, Afizere, Amo, Anaguta, Aten, Bijim, Bogghom, Buji, Jipal, Mhiship, Irchip, Fier, Fulani, Gashish, Hausa, Irigwe, Jarawa, Jukun, Kadung, Kofyar (comprising Doemak, Kwalla and Mernyang), Mushere, Mupun, Ngas, Piapung, Pyem, Ron-Kulere, Bache, Talet, Tiv, Tarok, and Youm. These ethnic groups are predominantly farmers and have similar cultural and traditional ways of life. People from other parts of country have come to settle in the state; these include the Idoma, Igbo, Yoruba, Ibibio, Annang, Efik, Ijaw, and Bini.

Each ethnic group has its own distinct language, but as with the rest of the country, English is the official language in the state; Hausa is also a common medium of communication and commerce as is the case in most parts of the North and Middle Belt of Nigeria.

Attacks

There have been several major attacks in Plateau State, mostly in Jos, including riots and bombings by jihadist Boko Haram insurgents. Plateau State has been a venue of clashes between the minority Muslim Hausa-Fulani herders and predominantly Christian farmers like the other states of Middle Belt area of Nigeria. There have been cases of attacks away from the state capital, most recently, one which drew international attention as the site of multiple attacks attributed to Fulani herdsmen. These included a series of attacks carried out on Christian communities in Plateau State from June 2018 onward which were estimated to have taken the lives of at least 200 people and left many others homeless. In 2022, a bandit gang attacked several villages.

Education 
Tertiary institutions in Plateau State include:
College of Education, Gindiri
 Federal College of Animal Health and Production Technology, Vom
Federal College of Education, Pankshin
 Plateau State Polytechnic
 Plateau State University
 University of Jos

ANAN University, Kwall
Federal College of Forestry, Jos
Federal College of Land Resources Technology, Kuru Jos 
Karl-Kumm University, Vom
NTA TV College, Jos
Plateau State College of Agriculture, Garkawa

Languages
Languages of Plateau State listed by LGA:

Notable people 

 
 M.I Abaga - (born 1981), hip hop recording artist and record producer
 Domkat Bali
 Solomon Dalung - (born 1964), politician, lawyer and academic
 Joshua Chibi Dariye - (born 1957), former Governor of Plateau State
 Yusuf Adamu Gagdi
Joseph Nanven Garba - (1943-2001), general, diplomat, and politician who served as president of the United Nations General Assembly
 Yakubu Gowon - (born 1934), Nigerian army general, former military leader and Head of State of Nigeria
 Joseph Gomwalk - (1935-1976), police commissioner and first Military Governor of Benue-Plateau State
 Jeremiah Gyang - (born 1981), singer-songwriter, instrumentalist and record producer
 Ruby Gyang
 Jesse Jagz
 Jonah David Jang
 Simon Lalong
 Solomon Lar
 Rimini Makama: Nigerian lawyer, entrepreneur, and the Communications Director at Africa Practice
 Angela Miri
 Mikel John Obi
 Panam Percy Paul
 Ice Prince
 Sim Shagaya
 P-Square
 John Nanzip Shagaya
 Pauline Tallen
 Jeremiah Useni:He was the former Minister of the Federal Capital Territory (1993-1998).
 Ahmed Idris Wase
 Muhammadu Abdullahi Wase

Politics
The state government is led by a democratical elected governor who works closely with members of the state's house of assembly. The capital city of the state is Jos.

Electoral system
The governor of each state is selected using a modified two-round system. To be elected in the first round, a candidate must receive the plurality of the vote and over 25% of the vote in at least two -third of the State local government Areas. If no candidate passes threshold, a second round will be held between the top candidate and the next candidate to have received a plurality of votes in the highest number of local government Areas.

See also
List of radio stations in Plateau State Nigeria

References

External links
 Plateau State Government
 Blench, R. M., Daniel, P. & Hassan, Umaru (2003): Access rights and conflict over common pool resources in three states in Nigeria. Report to Conflict Resolution Unit, World Bank (extracted section on Jos Plateau)
 Hiking on the Plateau
 Aerial view of Plateau State

 
States and territories established in 1976
States of Nigeria
Culture and the environment